The following is a timeline of Oradea, a city in western Romania.

 9th-10th centuries: According to Gesta Hungarorum, Menumorut ruled the area - with a citadel centered in Bihar - until the Hungarian conquest of the Carpathian Basin. 
 10th century: Várad (vár = castle, -ad = diminutive suffix [cf. Herend, Kermend, Kövösd, Fertőd, Városd, Jobbágy, Hortobágy]) is founded.
 1082–1095: The Várad Bishopric was founded by King Ladislaus I of Hungary.
 12th century: Becomes a cultural and religious center of the Kingdom of Hungary
 1208–1235: Regestrum Varadiensis, the oldest document mentioning Oradea
 13th century: The city flourished. 
 1412: Wladislaus II of Poland visits the grave of St. Ladislaus barefoot.
 1437: Sigismund dies and was buried in Oradea Cathedral.
 1445: John Vitéz of Zredna becomes bishop.
 1474: The city is devastated by the Turks.
 1514: A peasant uprising, led by György Dózsa, ransacked and burned the city.
 1526: Bishop of Oradea Francis Perenyi is killed in the Battle of Mohács.
 1538: Zápolyai’s ablest adviser, the Croat Franciscan Friar George, mediates the secret agreement of Oradea in which each claimant (Ferdinand of Habsburg and John I of Hungary) recognises the other's title and the territorial status quo.
 1541: Buda falls, and refugees arrive in Oradea.
 1557: Queen Isabella's captain, Tamas Varkoch, captures the fortress and the bishopric's estates are confiscated.
 1565: Saint Ladislaus' grave is defaced.
 1570–1596: A new fortress is built in late-Italian Renaissance style.
 1598–1606: Oradea secedes from Transylvania.
 1598: The fortress is besieged and, on August 27, 1660, Oradea falls to the Turks.

See also 
 History of Oradea
 Prehistory of Transylvania
 Ancient history of Transylvania
 History of Transylvania

References

Oradea